The 1998 Connecticut gubernatorial election took place on November 3, 1998, and incumbent Republican Governor John G. Rowland won re-election against Democratic Candidate United States Congresswoman Barbara B. Kennelly.

Democratic primary

Candidates 
 Barbara B. Kennelly, U.S Representative from the CT-01

Results 
Kennelly was unopposed in the Democratic primary.

Republican primary

Candidates 
John G. Rowland, incumbent Governor of Connecticut

Results 
Rowland was unopposed in the Republican primary.

General election

Candidates

Democratic
Barbara B. Kennelly, U.S Representative from the CT-01
Running mate: Joe Courtney, Member of Connecticut House of Representatives

Republican
John G. Rowland, incumbent Governor of Connecticut 
Running mate: Jodi Rell, incumbent Lieutenant Governor of Connecticut

Results

References

Gubernatorial
1998
Connecticut